Conus ruthae is a species of sea snail, a marine gastropod mollusk in the family Conidae, the cone snails, cone shells or cones.

These snails are predatory and venomous. They are capable of "stinging" human by means of a small harpoon-like venomous stinger extruded through the shell opening. 

The threat by snails to humans is limited as the primary habitat of the snails is in deeper waters (20-100m), so contact with humans other than divers is minimized.

Description
The size of the shell varies between 40 mm and 54 mm.

Distribution
This marine species occurs off the Philippines.

References

 E. Monnier & L. Limpalaer, 2013, Kioconus ruthae n. sp; Visaya Vol. IV No. 1 p. 11-16
 Puillandre N., Duda T.F., Meyer C., Olivera B.M. & Bouchet P. (2015). One, four or 100 genera? A new classification of the cone snails. Journal of Molluscan Studies. 81: 1-23

External links
 World Register of Marine Species
 Holotype in MNHN, Paris

ruthae
Gastropods described in 2013